The Cadillac Gage Peacekeeper II (PK II) is a four-wheeled, lightly armoured vehicle, developed by Textron Marine and Land Systems. The Peacekeeper II is designed primarily for the use of law enforcement agencies in urban environments for SWAT operations, base security, convoy protection, counter-terrorism and riot control. The vehicle is an evolution of the Cadillac Gage Ranger.

It is developed at a unit cost of approximately US$170,000.

The vehicle is no longer offered by Textron with trademarks cancelled.

History
A working model of the Peacekeeper II was first shown to visitors at the Law Enforcement Tactical Response Show & Conference (TREXPO) West exhibit in 2003 after Textron representatives announced that the vehicles was in development back in 2002 at TREXPO East.

In 2018, the 509th Logistics Readiness Squadron in Whiteman Air Force Base acquired a Peacekeeper II for static display purposes.

Design

Armor
During tests, the armour proved to be capable of withstanding impacts from twenty two different types of ammunition, the highest caliber ammunition out of these being 7.62 mm armour-piercing round.

The windows are made of ballistic glass, and the Peacekeeper II is equipped with run flat inserts on its tires.

Capabilities
The Peacekeeper II can carry a maximum of 8 personnel. This consists of the driver, one passenger in the front seat and six passengers in the cabin at the rear.

The vehicle is powered by a  V8 gas engine. Optionally, this can be replaced with a  diesel engine. It is equipped with 4-wheel drive, an Allison automatic transmission, and power steering. It can reach a maximum speed of 70 mph (112.5 km/h)

Apart from law enforcement, the vehicle is intended for use in counter terrorism operations, SWAT operations, convoy protection, and base security.

Features
In addition to the high level of protection, the vehicle also provides a high degree of comfort. It is equipped with air conditioning and heaters, and the interior is fully insulated. Bucket seats are provided for the driver and front passenger, while bench seats are provided for the rear cabin.

Large windows made of ballistic glass and eight view vision blocks in the rear cabin are provided for visibility. Eight pistol ports are located below each of the vision blocks.

Foldable running boards with handrails are included on each side of the vehicle and at the back, offering mobile tactical advantage and protection to the crew.

Armament
The addition of weapons is supported by a rotating cupola. The cupola is optional, and removable, and mounted atop the roof. This is rotatable 180 degrees, and allows the addition of a Squad automatic weapon (SAW), or M240 machine gun. or MK19 Mod3 40mm automatic grenade launcher. 

The firing ports also allow the accommodation of various weapons, and have the capability to disperse crowd control devices such as smoke grenades, with minimum risk to the crew.

References

External links
 Archived Textron brochure

Armored fighting vehicles of the United States